Sankalp India Foundations is a Bangalore-based non-government organisation. It is a youth organisation working for blood donation, thalassemia, bone marrow transplantation and disaster relief.

Voluntary Blood Donation
Since 2003, it has been working for voluntary blood donation in Karnataka. A blood helpline is run by the organisation. It also organizes several blood donation camps. It is one of the pioneer organisations which helps patients worldwide with a rare blood group "Bombay Blood Group" (also known as hh blood group).

Sankalp India Foundation has done extensive work in the areas of quality and safety of blood donation camps, studying the extent of non-compliance and adverse donor events blood banks in voluntary blood donation camps.

Thalassemia Management
Sankalp India Foundation runs several day care centers across South and West India for patients suffering from Thalassemia and related blood disorders .
 Thal Day Care, Indira Gandhi Institute of Child Health, Bangalore
 Project Samraksha, Rashtrotthana Parishat, Bangalore 
 Wenlock District Hospital, Mangalore 
 Jai Shivshakti Center For Thalassemia, Jawaharlal Nehru Medical College, Belgaum
 Thalassemia and Sickle Cell Centre, Nagpur
 Radha Mohan Mehrotra Global Hospital Trauma Center, Abu Road
 Indian Red Cross Society, Nellore
 Sankalp Centre for Thalassemia Care, Rajkot
 Sarvoday Samarpan, Mumbai
 Shree Jalaram Abhuday Sadbhavana Trust, Ahmedabad
 Indian Red Cross Society, Eluru
 Mamata Foundation, Vijayawada
 KJ Somaiya Hospital, Mumbai
 Day care centre at RDT Hospital, Ananthapur is also part of the network.

Thalassemia Prevention 
The StopThalassemia campaign is an initiative of Sankalp India Foundation to strengthen Thalassemia prevention by focusing on antenatal screening. The campaign provides screening services to pregnant women and their husbands in the first trimester of their pregnancy. The following maternity centres are part of the StopThalassemia Campaign:
 Lady Goschen Hospital – Mangalore
 District Hospital – Tumkur
 Rural Development Trust - Bathalapalli – Ananthpur
 Viswa Bharathi Super Speciality Hospital - Kurnool
 Father Muller Medical College – Mangalore
 Daga Memorial Government Women Hospital - Nagpur.

Disaster relief
Sankalp also participates in disaster relief activities. A few of the disasters in which it participated for relief are the Tsunami on the Indian sub continent, Karnataka floods, Sikkim earthquake, J&K earthquake, and the Assam floods.

Bone Marrow Transplant
Sankalp India Foundation has been offering bone marrow transplantation for patients suffering from thalassemia. The organisation started the first bone marrow transplantation center In collaboration with People Tree Hospitals and Cure2Children Foundation, Italy in Bangalore in August 2015. In May 2017, the organisation has started a new bone marrow transplantation center in collaboration with Care Institute of Medical Science, Ahmedabad.
In November 2017 Sankalp got into an understanding with MY Hospital, Indore for the new Bone Marrow Transplantation Program which started in March 2018.  a new centre was started in Bangalore in June 2021 at Bhagwan Mahaveer Jain Hospital, Bangalore. The organisation has done more than 500 transplants for patients with thalassemia until December 2022.

Achievements
 AmeriCares India Jury's Choice ‘Spirit of Humanity Awards’ 2011
 AmeriCares India Winner in Thalassemia category at ‘Spirit of Humanity Awards’ 2014
 "Winner of Manthan Award Asia Pacific - 2013" under e-Health category.
 Winner of The eNgo Challenge 2014 South Asia under "Organizational Efficiency" category
 AmeriCares India Winner in child care category at ‘Spirit of Humanity Awards’ 2016

References

Organisations based in Bangalore
Organizations established in 2003
Blood banks in India
Blood donation
2003 establishments in Karnataka